Randy Yormein Chirino Serrano (born 16 January 1996) is a Costa Rican professional footballer.

Career

From 2016 to early 2017, Chirino refused to turn up to training with Saprissa due to not playing regularly.

References

External links
 

Living people
1996 births
Costa Rican footballers
Association football forwards
Association football midfielders
Deportivo Saprissa players
A.D. San Carlos footballers
Liga FPD players
People from San Carlos (canton)